Pseudocodon is a genus of flowering plants belonging to the family Campanulaceae.

Its native range is Central Himalaya to Southern Central China.

Species:

Pseudocodon convolvulaceus 
Pseudocodon graminifolius 
Pseudocodon grey-wilsonii 
Pseudocodon hirsutus 
Pseudocodon petiolatus 
Pseudocodon retroserratus 
Pseudocodon rosulatus 
Pseudocodon vinciflorus

References

Campanuloideae
Campanulaceae genera